Metroid Prime: Trilogy is a compilation of action-adventure games  from the Metroid franchise developed by Retro Studios and published by Nintendo for the Wii. It features three games from the Metroid franchise: Metroid Prime (2002), Metroid Prime 2: Echoes (2004) and Metroid Prime 3: Corruption (2007). 

Prime and Echoes, originally developed for the GameCube, were updated with many features first implemented in Corruption, such as a control scheme based on the Wii Remote and Nunchuk and a credits system supported by the WiiConnect24 internet service.

Metroid Prime: Trilogy was released in North America in August 2009, followed by Europe and Australia in September and October. It was not released in Japan, where ports of Prime and Echoes were released separately as part of the New Play Control! series. In January 2010, Nintendo discontinued the compilation in both North America and Australia.

Metroid Prime: Trilogy was acclaimed, with praise for the new controls, updated presentation, credits system, and value for money. It was rereleased on the Wii U's Nintendo eShop in January 2015.

Content

Metroid Prime: Trilogy is a video game compilation which includes Metroid Prime, Metroid Prime 2: Echoes and Metroid Prime 3: Corruption. The first two games were originally released for the GameCube and did not feature motion controls. The updated Wii versions of Prime and Echoes, which were released separately in Japan as part of the New Play Control! series, utilize the same Wii Remote control scheme introduced in Corruption. The Spring Ball ability featured in Corruption is also implemented in the first two games. Other changes include faster load times, updated textures, bloom lighting, and 16:9 widescreen support. However, the heads-up display is always shown at the original aspect ratio, causing it to be stretched horizontally when in widescreen mode.

The credits system from Corruption was incorporated into the first two games. Players can earn credits by accomplishing certain tasks, allowing them to unlock in-game items such as artwork, music, a screenshot feature, decorative items for Samus's gunship in Corruption, and the Fusion Suit in Prime, in which the latter was previously unlocked by connecting the Game Boy Advance game Metroid Fusion. Credits could also be shared with registered Wii friends, who also have a copy of Trilogy, via WiiConnect24 which used the Wii's own 16-digit number as opposed to a separate Friend Code. The save data for the original release of Corruption cannot be carried over to its Trilogy version. The compilation also features the multiplayer mode from Echoes, which is limited to four-player local multiplayer and does not feature online play. In response to complaints from players and critics about Echoess high difficulty during some of the boss battles, the difficulty of those encounters was lowered. The games are accessible through a new, unified start menu, which also allows independent access to the Echoes multiplayer mode, the extras menu, and other settings.

Development

In 2004, while Retro Studios was finishing Echoes, senior producer Bryan Walker suggested to studio president Michael Kelbaugh to "do something for the fans by putting all the games together on a single disc in a collector[']s 'trilogy' edition". Kelbaugh sent the proposal to Nintendo. Development started shortly before the release of Corruption, and employed a team of four staff members, as most of the crew was busy with Donkey Kong Country Returns. Prime series producer Kensuke Tanabe asked the staff to resolve most of the glitches for the Trilogy release to prevent sequence breaking.

Walker considered the compilation to be "an almost unheard of opportunity to take something you had already released and make it better". Senior designer Mike Wikan said most of the content additions were subtle changes, such as streamlining the engines for steady framerates and shorter loading times, and higher resolution textures. Prime had the addition of light bloom, and Echoes had difficulty tweaks to make it "more accessible to those who were really intimidated early on". For Corruption, the code was examined to find ways to make it run faster and better than in the original Wii release. The particle and water ripple effects found in the original versions of Prime were reduced, while the word "damn" uttered by the character Admiral Dane in Corruptions original release was also replaced with "no".

Release
In October 2008, Nintendo presented the New Play Control! series of GameCube ports, with Prime and Echoes among the initial games in Japan. For international version, Metroid Prime: Trilogy was released in North America on August 24, 2009, packaged in a steelbook case, along with an art booklet. The European release in the following month maintained the booklet, while the Australian release in October only had a metallic cardboard slip cover. In January 2010, Nintendo of America was no longer producing or shipping copies of the game and recommended to players to find second hand copies of Trilogy via video game stores. Nintendo Australia also discontinued the game at the same time. Following Nintendo of America's announcement, Nintendo of Europe assured that the game was not discontinued in their region.

In April 2011, a copy of Trilogy—signed by Retro Studios staff and Tanabe—was auctioned, with 100 percent of proceeds to be donated to the relief efforts for the Tōhoku earthquake and tsunami. In August 2013, a gaming retailer GameStop acquired a significant stock of pre-owned copies of Metroid Prime: Trilogy, alongside Xenoblade Chronicles, without shrink wrap. Kelbaugh said at the 2011 Game Developers Conference that the studio had no plans for Metroid Prime: Trilogy to be re-released. Despite this, the compilation would see a re-release alongside Super Mario Galaxy 2 on the Wii U's Nintendo eShop. It was made available in North America and Europe on January 29, 2015, and in Australia and New Zealand one day later.

Technical issues
Metroid Prime: Trilogy uses a dual-layer disc to allow all three games to fit on a single disc. Nintendo of America stated that some Wii consoles may have difficulty reading the high-density software due to a contaminated laser lens. At one point, Nintendo offered a free repair for owners who experienced this problem.

Reception

Metroid Prime: Trilogy was released to critical acclaim. GameSpys Phil Theobald praised it for being the compilation of three great games for the price of one. Matt Casamassina of IGN cited the "fantastic gameplay" and "brilliant presentation values", while Martin Kitts of NGamer UK praised the achievements system and value for money. Eurogamers Kristan Reed thought the new implementations made it attractive to newcomers and old-time fans, and declared that "not since Super Mario All Stars in the SNES era has Nintendo taken an opportunity to unite one of its great series in such an irresistible way". 1UP.coms Jeremy Parish liked the implementation of the new control scheme, stating that "the smooth precision of the Wii Remote makes the older games well worth revisiting".

GamePros Ashley Schoeller said that graphically "the games do look a bit dated" and complained that the HUD was "out of aspect" to fit the widescreen. Official Nintendo Magazines Fred Dutton said that some aspects of Prime and Echoes had aged, saying the backtracking "feels like more of a chore than it did seven years ago" and that it is "not until [Echoes] enters its final third that things really start to pick up". GamesRadar considered the achievements too expensive, and that the similarity between the three games gives "an inescapable sense of déjà vu". Edge noted that the control scheme was not innovative, and that Echoes and Corruption "favoured graphical flourishes over design innovation". While Ben Reeves of Game Informer praised the game, the "second opinion" reviewer, Adam Biessener, considered the compilation "subpar", saying it lacked innovation, and that the Wii control scheme, particularly aiming and panning, is inferior to the traditional scheme from the GameCube games.

In IGN's Top 25 Wii Games list, Metroid Prime: Trilogy ranked third (2011), and fourth (2012). In a feature article regarding games collections, Bob Mackey of 1UP.com listed Trilogy as the "Hardest-to-find Work of Greatness", noting that it "had a conspicuously low print run; finding a copy in the wild proves difficult, and eBay prices often reach 100 dollars".

References

External links
Metroid Prime: Trilogy at nintendo.com

2009 video games
Metroid Prime
New Play Control! games
Retro Studios games
Nintendo video game compilations
Video games developed in the United States
Video games set on fictional planets
Wii games
Wii games re-released on the Nintendo eShop
Trilogies
Metroid games
Video games produced by Kensuke Tanabe